Steve Staker (May 28, 1943 – April 28, 2020), also known as Papa Stake, was an American football coach. Staker served as the head football coach at the Coe College in Cedar Rapids, Iowa from 2008 to 2015. He was honored the Liberty Mutual Coach of the Year Award for NCAA Division III in 2009. He attended at Upper Iowa University.

Personal life and legay
Staker was married to Linda King until his death in 2020. They had four children. Staker died in April 2020 of gallbladder cancer in Lisbon, Iowa, at the age of 76.

Coe College registered a plaque for Staker at the Clark Field Stadium. It's marked with people celebrating his career featuring the Hall of Fame.

Head coaching record

College

References

External links
 Coe profile
 Upper Iowa University Athletics Hall of Fame profile

1943 births
2020 deaths
American football fullbacks
Coe Kohawks football coaches
Upper Iowa Peacocks football players
Coe College faculty
High school football coaches in Iowa
Sportspeople from Waterloo, Iowa
Coaches of American football from Iowa
Players of American football from Iowa
Deaths from cancer in Iowa
Deaths from gallbladder cancer